Robert Andrews may refer to:

Rob Andrews (baseball) (born 1952), Major League Baseball second baseman
Rob Andrews (born 1957), New Jersey politician
Robert Andrews (translator) (1723–1766), English Dissenter, minister, poet and translator of Virgil
Robert Andrews (landowner) (1725–1806), subject of a painting by Thomas Gainsborough
Robert Andrews (clergyman) (1748–1804), American clergyman, professor and Virginia politician
Robert Andrews (civil servant) (died 1821), British government official, Resident and Superintendent of British Ceylon (1796–1798)
Robert Andrews (architect) (1857–1928), American architect
Robert Andrews (actor) (1895–1976), British actor
Robert Hardy Andrews (1903–1976), American novelist, screenwriter and radio drama script–writer
Robert Wilson Andrews (1837–1922), Hawaii-born artist and engineer
Robby Andrews (born 1991), American athlete

See also
Bob Andrews (disambiguation)
Robert Andrew (disambiguation)